Andrey Kuznetsov was the defending champion but chose not to defend his title.

Kenny de Schepper won the title after defeating Marco Cecchinato 2–6, 7–6(7–0), 7–5 in the final.

Seeds

Draw

Finals

Top half

Bottom half

References
 Main Draw
 Qualifying Draw

Citta di Como Challenger - Singles
Città di Como Challenger